WCCA may refer to:

 Wartime Civilian Control Administration
 WCCA-LP, a low-power radio station (93.5 FM) licensed to Scottsville, Virginia, United States
 Web Cartoonists' Choice Awards
 Wilkinson County Christian Academy, a segregation academy in Woodville, Mississippi
 Worshipful Company of Chartered Architects, the 97th Livery Company of the City of London
 Worst-case circuit analysis, an acronym used in electrical/electronics engineering
 WYAY (FM), a radio station (106.3 FM) licensed to Shallotte, North Carolina, United States, which used the call sign WCCA from September 1990 to July 2003